Begonia luxurians, the palm leaf begonia, is a species of flowering plant in the genus Begonia, native to southeastern Brazil. It has gained the Royal Horticultural Society's Award of Garden Merit.

References

luxurians
Endemic flora of Brazil
Plants described in 1848